The Good Conduct Medal was a military decoration of South Vietnam. Established in 1964, the medal recognized the display of exemplary conduct and discipline. It also required three years of service in the Republic of Vietnam Armed Forces.

The Good Conduct Medal has five different grades and some of them contains the fleur-de-lis device, starting from the fourth ranks and up.

See also
Military awards and decorations of South Vietnam

References

Military awards and decorations of Vietnam
Awards established in 1964
1964 establishments in Vietnam
Military of South Vietnam